HMS Falcon was a member of the standardize 20-gun sixth rates built at the end of the 17th Century. She had a very brief career in the Royal Navy as she was captured shortly after commissioning by two French ships. She was recaptured in 1703 then broken.

Falcon was the twelfth named vessel since it was used for a ballinger dating from 1343 and sold in 1352.

Construction
She was ordered in the Second Batch of eight ships to be built under contract by Nicholas Barret of Shoreham. She was launched on 28 September 1694.

Commissioned Service
She was commissioned on 13 October 1694 under the command of Captain Henry Middleton, RN.

Disposition
HMS Falcon was taken on 10 June 1695 by the French 40-gun Le Sainte-Antoine and the 24-gun Le Tigre off Dodman Point. She was retaken by the British in 1703 and broken.

Citations

References
 Winfield, British Warships in the Age of Sail (1603 – 1714), by Rif Winfield, published by Seaforth Publishing, England © 2009, EPUB , Chapter 6, The Sixth Rates, Vessels acquired from 18 December 1688, Sixth Rates of 20 guns and up to 26 guns, Maidstone Group, Falcon
 Colledge, Ships of the Royal Navy, by J.J. Colledge, revised and updated by Lt Cdr Ben Warlow and Steve Bush, published by Seaforth Publishing, Barnsley, Great Britain, © 2020, e  (EPUB), Section F (Falcon)

 

1690s ships
Corvettes of the Royal Navy
Naval ships of the United Kingdom